Kävlinge is a locality and the seat of Kävlinge Municipality, Skåne County, Sweden with 32,341 inhabitants in 2021.

In 1996, a train containing large amounts of ammonia derailed and around 9,000 people had to be evacuated from the area. This was the biggest evacuation operation in Swedish history.

Near Kävlinge is the site of the Hög passage grave, a Bronze Age barrow covering a neolithic burial chamber. Hög means mound from the Old Norse word haugr for hill. The finds from the excavations are in the Lund University Historic Museum.

Battle of Lund 
Kävlinge is located north of Lund and has a river passing through called Kävlingeån (translated Kävlinge River). The river played an important role at the events leading up to the Battle of Lund, which was a battle in the Scanian War.

References

External links

Municipal seats of Skåne County
Swedish municipal seats
Populated places in Skåne County
Populated places in Kävlinge Municipality
Populated places in the Øresund Region
20th-century establishments in Skåne County